Etene Nanai-Seturo (born 20 August 1999) is a New Zealand rugby union player.

Etene Nanai-Seturo is a New Zealand born Rugby Union player. He plays fullback. Recently played in the New Zealand Schoolboys side and represented Counties Manukau in the Mitre 10 Cup. He attended Saint Kentigern College where his rugby would stand out for him. He currently plays for New Zealand in the Sevens Tournament, as well as, the Chiefs in the Super Rugby Competition.

References

External links
 
 Etene Nanai at All Blacks Sevens
 
 Etene Nanai-Seturo at RUGBY.com.au

New Zealand rugby union players
Living people
1999 births
Rugby sevens players at the 2018 Commonwealth Games
Commonwealth Games rugby sevens players of New Zealand
Commonwealth Games gold medallists for New Zealand
Commonwealth Games medallists in rugby sevens
Rugby sevens players at the 2020 Summer Olympics
Olympic medalists in rugby sevens
Olympic silver medalists for New Zealand
Medalists at the 2020 Summer Olympics
People educated at Saint Kentigern College
Olympic rugby sevens players of New Zealand
Moana Pasifika players
Rugby union wings
Rugby union fullbacks
Counties Manukau rugby union players
Chiefs (rugby union) players
Medallists at the 2018 Commonwealth Games